Terebra bratcherae is a species of sea snail, a marine gastropod mollusc in the family Terebridae, the auger snails.

Description

Distribution

References

Terebridae
Gastropods described in 1987